Zsolt Fehér (born 13 September 1985 in Székesfehérvár) is a Hungarian football player who currently plays for Tiszafüred VSE.

References

External links

Profile at HLSZ

1985 births
Living people
Sportspeople from Székesfehérvár
Hungarian footballers
Association football defenders
Fehérvár FC players
Lombard-Pápa TFC footballers
FC Tatabánya players
BFC Siófok players
Békéscsaba 1912 Előre footballers
Nemzeti Bajnokság I players
Nemzeti Bajnokság II players